The 1958 Clemson Tigers football team was an American football team that represented Clemson College in the Atlantic Coast Conference (ACC) during the 1958 NCAA University Division football season. In its 19th season under head coach Frank Howard, the team compiled an 8–3 record (5–1 against conference opponents), won the ACC championship, was ranked No. 12 in the final AP Poll (No. 13 Coaches Poll), and outscored opponents by a total of 169 to 138. The team played its home games at Memorial Stadium in Clemson, South Carolina.

Coach Frank Howard's 100th win came September 27 against North Carolina.  Clemson also played its first game against a No. 1 ranked team when it played LSU in the 1959 Sugar Bowl.

Center Bill Thomas was the team captain. The team's statistical leaders included quarterback Harvey White with 492 passing yards and 30 points scored (five touchdowns) and fullback Doug Cline with 450 rushing yards.

Three Clemson players were selected as first-team players on the 1958 All-Atlantic Coast Conference football team: Bill Thomas; end Ray Masneri; and tackle Jim Padgett.

Schedule

References

Clemson
Clemson Tigers football seasons
Atlantic Coast Conference football champion seasons
Clemson Tigers football